New Urbanist Memes for Transit-Oriented Teens, also known as NUMTOT or Numtots and variations by its members, is a Facebook group dedicated to discussion, Internet memes, and general discourse surrounding New Urbanism and public transport. , the group has more than 227,000 members.

The group was created in March 2017 as "New Urbanist Shitposting", and was intended as a spin-off to another Facebook group, dedicated to maps and cartographic jokes. Reception of New Urbanist Memes for Transit-Oriented Teens is generally positive, with mentions that the group has inspired its members to take urban planning courses and apply for internships and jobs. The group's members have created about 20 to 50 spin-off groups related to the original.

History
Originally titled "New Urbanist Shitposting", the group was co-founded by Juliet Eldred, then a college senior at the University of Chicago; Emily Orenstein, a junior classmate; and Jonathan Marty of New York University; on March 14, 2017, during their Winter Quarter final exams. It was a spin-off of another Facebook group "I Feel Personally Attacked by this Relatable Map," run by Eldred and Orenstein, which concerned GIS and mapping humor. Its formation was spurred by a discussion of the National Interstate and Defense Highways Act of 1956.

On January 15, 2020, the NUMTOT "administrative board" (group administrators Juliet Eldred, Jonathan Marty, and Emily Orenstein, and group moderators William Clark and Sebastian Beaghen) announced their endorsement of Bernie Sanders for President of the United States.

Content
The group's content is user-submitted. As of March 2018, each post requires moderator approval. Posts include either Internet memes, links, news articles, and popular culture references. Internet memes have been related to Amtrak, Dungeons & Dragons, urbanist Jane Jacobs, New York City planner Robert Moses, and Thomas the Tank Engine among other related topics. The group's custom URL on Facebook is "whatwouldjanejacobsdo".

Forum administrators and moderators include co-founders Orenstein, Marty, and Eldred. Chicago magazine noted that the group has a strong left-wing political orientation, "imploring for public funds dedicated to transit, at a high cost to the rich."

, Eldred estimates there are 300 posts per day. Orenstein notes 40% of the membership is 18–25 years-old, while 25% work in transit-related fields. The Guardian stated it was "predominantly millennials". Since the CityLab coverage, Orenstein reported there was an "uptick in 'market urbanist types'." As of March 2018, its cover photo is a member-designed satirical map wherein each station is labelled with a reference to the group's myriad in-jokes.

Reactions

Reception
Reception for the group has been generally positive. Angles from the CPJ described New Urbanist Memes for Transit-Oriented Teens as "a Facebook group to provide for the dearth of urbanist memes of the internet." Chicago said its "most hilarious moments happen when these streams converge, applying elbow-patched academic remove to nonexistent objects of pop-culture speculation." CityLab called the group "a place to get engaged with matters of profound importance to local communities."

The student newspaper The Heights remarked that the co-founder of spin-off group Boston College Memes for Jesuit Tweens "enjoys the content posted in [the group]." The Montana Kaimin mentioned the group in an opinion piece for Neo-Luddism. The Spectrum included NUMTOT among "part of a rise in niche Facebook groups that are often light-hearted" with Cone Spotting and Dogspotting. Chicago StreetsBlog noted that "[the group] has U. of C. (University of Chicago) roots."

Internal dissent
In Autumn 2017, Eldred requested group members to compensate the moderation for emotional labor via Venmo which was met with a critical reception. Eldred said "There have been times where it's like we're being asked to moderate the Israeli–Palestinian conflict in a group about, you know, trains."

There has also been criticism about political orientation of the group. Eldred said "the communists complain that the group is too neoliberal, and the market urbanists complain that the group is too communist. A lot of people will rag on the mods for being centrists. And most of us are socialists."

Impact
The group has inspired a number of actions. Members have been inspired to take urban planning courses, apply for internships and jobs for city halls and United States Department of Transportation, and organize local meetups to discuss discourse. Eldred recruited members to her Democratic Socialists of America local chapter.

On January 15, 2020, NUMTOT administrators decided to endorse Bernie Sanders in the 2020 Democratic presidential primaries, praising his “message of peace, equity, and justice.” The reasons cited include Sanders’ support for building 10 million affordable housing units, making Section 8 housing assistance for low-income families an entitlement, national rent control, creating a National Housing Agency to combat housing discrimination, the Green New Deal, and investing $300 billion in public transport. In response, Sanders himself joined the group and thanked the group in a post, saying, “thank you NUMTOT for your support of our campaign, and for all you are doing to create the lasting and fundamental change our country needs”.

Spin-offs
Eldred says there are between 20 and 50 spin-offs, such as "7000-Series Memes for Congressionally Disenfranchised Teens" (for Washington, D.C.), "Form and Function Memes for Architectural Teens," "Old Urbanist Memes for Chariot Riding Teens", "Pre-Columbian Memes for Maize-Cultivating Teens," “Dank Neotraditional Architecture Memes for Premodern Teens”, "Two-Wheeled Memes for Bicycled-Oriented Teens", "Southwest Transit Memes for Desert-Oriented Teens", and "Amchad Memes for American Rail Apologist Teens".

A subreddit on Reddit where the participants create rapid transit systems based on the location of Subway restaurant franchises, called "subwaysubway", was inspired by a NUMTOT group discussion.

An Instagram account using the NUMTOTs handle was created to share popular memes in the group on the platform. The group is unaffiliated with the original NUMTOTs group.

See also
 Internet activism
 List of University of Chicago alumni
 Shitposting

References

External links
 
 Associated book group

2017 establishments in the United States
Facebook groups
Internet-based activism
Transport websites
Internet properties established in 2017
New Urbanism
Organizations established in 2017
Political Internet forums
Political Internet memes
Youth activists
Works about rail transport